Carlos Eiras (12 June 1932 – 13 September 2013) was an Argentine alpine skier. He competed in the men's downhill at the 1952 Winter Olympics.

References

1932 births
2013 deaths
Argentine male alpine skiers
Olympic alpine skiers of Argentina
Alpine skiers at the 1952 Winter Olympics
Skiers from Buenos Aires